Louis Clarence Jackson (July 26, 1935 – May 27, 1969) was an American professional baseball player.

Chicago Cubs
That season, he played for the class-C Magic Valley Cowboys, batting .310 with 15 home runs. The following season, he was moved up to the class-A Pueblo Dodgers, and made his major league debut in July. He played 24 games for the Cubs, with just 6 hits in 35 at-bats, including his first and only major league home run off Ray Semproch of the Philadelphia Phillies on August 3, 1958.

In , Jackson spent most of the season back in the minors, most of it with the class-A Lancaster Red Roses. He did play in 6 games for the Cubs that September, but had just four at-bats. During the offseason, he was traded with two other players to the Cincinnati Redlegs for Frank Thomas. Jackson wound up spending just one season in the Cincinnati organization before being acquired by the independent Toronto Maple Leafs. After one season with Maple Leafs, he was picked up by the Milwaukee Braves. He lasted just a single season with the Braves, and spent  with the Washington Senators organization.

Baltimore Orioles
After the 1963 season, he was drafted by the Orioles. He started the season with them, but played just four of the team's first 23 games. He spent the rest of 1964 and all of 1965 with the Rochester Red Wings, the Orioles' top minor league club.

Japan
In 1966, Jackson signed with the Sankei Atoms. In his first season in Japan, he hit 20 home runs in 97 games, batting .254. In 1967, he improved to a .296 batting average, with 28 home runs. The following season, however, he slumped at the plate, hitting just .219, and one day collapsed at home plate while batting. He died the following year of pancreatitis at age 33.

References

External links

 Foreign batting from Japan Baseball Daily

1935 births
1969 deaths
20th-century African-American sportspeople
African-American baseball players
American expatriate baseball players in Japan
Baltimore Orioles players
Baseball players from Louisiana
Chicago Cubs players
Deaths from pancreatitis
Fort Worth Cats players
Grambling State Tigers baseball players
Havana Sugar Kings players
Hawaii Islanders players
Jersey City Jerseys players
Lancaster Red Roses players
Magic Valley Cowboys players
Major League Baseball outfielders
People from Caldwell Parish, Louisiana
Pueblo Dodgers players
Rochester Red Wings players
Sankei Atoms players
Toronto Maple Leafs (International League) players
American expatriate baseball players in Cuba